Shin Moon-Sun (born March 11, 1958) is a soccer player from South Korea. He is also a professor at the Graduate School of Record Information Science at Myung-ji University and also works as a sports commentator.

Education
Cheongpa Elementary School in Seoul.
Seoul Physical Education Middle School.
Seoul Physical Education High School.
Majored in Physical Education at Yonsei University.
Majored in Physical Education at graduate school of education Yonsei University.
Majored in Sport Management at graduate school in Sejong University.

Club career
He was the founding member of Yukong Kokkiri

References

External links 
 

1959 births
Living people
South Korean footballers
K League 1 players
Busan IPark players
Jeju United FC players
Association footballers not categorized by position